Syed Saleem is a Telugu writer. He has written twenty five novels, about 250 short stories and more than 150 poems. His fiction has been translated into English, Hindi, Marathi, Oriya, Malayalam, Kannada and Tamil languages. His work is characterized by his humanitarianism and soothing poetic expression. One of his best known works is his Telugu novel Kaluthunna Poolathota, which had won the * Sahitya Akademi Award in Telugu, 2010.

Early life 
Saleem was born in Throvagunta village near Ongole on 1 June 1959. He began writing poetry while in school. He earned an M.Sc. (Tech) degree from Andhra University.

Career
Saleem began writing short fiction in 1980; his first story was "Manishi". His stories have been adapted as a television serial, Saleem Kathalu, which has aired on the Telugu language television channel DD Yadagiri. One of his stories, "Aaro Alludu" has been included in the second volume of World Best Stories, published by Bangalore University.

'Abhyudaya Sahiti Puraskaram' was presented to him in 2012 at the cultural festival ‘Sampradaya Sanskritika Vaibhavam-4'.

Many of Saleem's stories have been translated  into Kannada, Hindi, Oriya and  Marathi. Twenty selected stories were translated into English and published as Ocean and other Stories by Prism Publications, Bangalore. Another twenty stories were published as Three dimensions and other stories by the Prism publication. His novels Vendi Megham and Kaluthunna Poolathota have been translated into several languages.

In 2016 he is working as an additional commissioner of income tax in Nagpur.

Works

Published collection of poems
Neeloki Choosina Gnapakam, 1999
Aakulu Raale Drusyam, 2005
Vishada Varnam, 2013

Published collections of Short Stories
Swathi Chinukulu, 1996
Nissabda Sangeetham, 1999
Roopayi Chettu, 2004
Chadarapu Yenugu, 2006
Raanigari Kathalu, 2008
Ontari Sareeram, 2009 
Rekkala Harivillu, 2011
Antarganam, 2014
Neeti Putta, 2017
Maya Jalatharu, 2018

Novels
Jeevanmrutulu, 2001
Vendimegham, 2003
Kanchana Mrugam, 2006
Kalutuhunna Poolathota, 2006
Padaga Needa, 2009
Marana kanksha, 2012
Gurrapu dekka, 2013
Anoohya Pelli, 2013
Anaamika Diary, 2014
Aranyaparvam, 2015
Kaavyanjali, 2016
Mounaraagam, 2016
Aparaajita, 2016
Medha 017, 2017
Anveshana, 2017
Doodipinjalu, 2017
Little Julie, 2017
Edari Poolu, 2018 
Garbhagudi, 2018 
Pagadapu Deevi, 2018
Guhalo Okaroju, 2019
Padileche Keratam, 2019
Operation Kitin, 2019
Rendu Aakasala Madhya, 2020
Manogna, 2020

Awards 

Sahitya Akademi Award in Telugu for the novel kaaluthunna Poolathota in the year 2010.
Saahitee Award from P.S.Telugu University for the novel "Vendi   Megham" in 2005 ( State Sahitya Akademy was merged into P.S. Telugu University)
Raashtriya Vikas Shiromani Award from Delhi Telugu Akademy in 2005
Bhasha Puraskaram from Govt of Andhra Pradesh in 2003
Madabhushi Rangachari Award for "roopayi Chettu" in 2003
Dhrmanidhi Puraskaram from Telugu University for Short Stories
Chaso Literary Award in 2008 for story writing
Vasireddy Sitadevi Sahitya Puraskaram for Novel writing in 2007
Kovvali Literary Award for novel writing in 2009
"Nayee Imaarat Ke Khandhar" Hindi version of the novel "Kaluthunna Poolathota" won National Human Rights Commission Award in 2009

References

External links 

 http://www.cpbrownacademy.org/velthuru_chettu.asp
 http://www.museindia.com/focuscontent.asp?issid=42&id=3182

1961 births
Living people
Telugu writers
21st-century Indian short story writers
People from Ongole
Andhra University alumni
Recipients of the Sahitya Akademi Award in Telugu